Corrado Segre (20 August 1863 – 18 May 1924) was an Italian mathematician who is remembered today as a major contributor to the early development of algebraic geometry.

Early life 
Corrado's parents were Abramo Segre and Estella De Benedetti.

Career 
Segre developed his entire career at the University of Turin, first as a student of Enrico D'Ovidio. In 1883 he published a dissertation on quadrics in projective space and was named as assistant to professors in algebra and analytic geometry. In 1885 he also assisted in descriptive geometry. He began to instruct in projective geometry, as stand-in for Giuseppe Bruno, from 1885 to 1888. Then for 36 years he had the chair in higher geometry following D'Ovidio. Segre and Giuseppe Peano made Turin known in geometry, and their complementary instruction has been noted as follows:

The Erlangen program of Felix Klein appealed early on to Segre, and he became a promulgator. First, in 1885 he published an article on conics in the plane where he demonstrated how group theory facilitated the study. As Hawkins says (page 252) "the totality of all conics in the plane is identified with P5(C)". The group of its projectivities is then the group that permutes conics. About Segre, Hawkins writes

The inspiring Geometrie der Lage (1847) of Karl Georg Christian von Staudt provided Segre with another project. He encouraged Mario Pieri to make a translation, Geometria di Posizione (1889), while Segre composed a biographical sketch of von Staudt that was included in the publication.

Segre also expanded algebraic geometry by consideration of multicomplex numbers, in particular the bicomplex numbers. Segre's 1892 contribution to Mathematische Annalen shows him extending the work of William Rowan Hamilton and William Kingdon Clifford on biquaternions. But Segre was unaware of earlier study of tessarines that had anticipated his bicomplex numbers.

In English, the best known work of Segre is an inspirational essay meant for Italian students, translated by J.W. Young in 1904. It provides guidance and encouragement to young people studying mathematics.

In a 1926 memorial article, H.F. Baker called Segre the "father of" the Italian school of algebraic geometry.

The 1912 article "Higher-dimensional Spaces" (Mehrdimensionale Räume) for Enzyklopädie der mathematischen Wissenschaften spanned 200 pages. In admiration, Baker (1926) wrote and Coolidge (1927) reiterated
For completeness of detail, breadth of view, and generous recognition of the work of a host of other writers, this must remain for many years a monument of the comprehensiveness of the man.

Notes

References 

 .
 .
 
 
 . (see especially pages 455–67)
 Pierre Speziale (1975) "Corrado Segre", Dictionary of Scientific Biography, auspices of American Council of Learned Societies.
 Livia Giacardi (2001) "The Corrado Segre Archive", Historia Mathematica 28: 296–301.
 Livia Giacardi, 2002, (Ed.) I Quaderni di Corrado Segre, CD-ROM, Dipartimento di matematica, Università di Torino.

External links 
 
 

1863 births
1924 deaths
People from Saluzzo
20th-century Italian Jews
19th-century Italian mathematicians
20th-century Italian mathematicians
Differential geometers
University of Turin alumni
Academic staff of the University of Turin
Algebraic geometers
Italian algebraic geometers
19th-century Italian Jews